Anthony Mervyn Jorden (28 January 1947) is a former English sportsman who played international rugby union for England and first-class cricket.

Education
Jorden received his early education at Monmouth School and then went up to Fitzwilliam College, Cambridge, where he represented the university at both rugby union and cricket.

Cricket career
He began playing cricket for the Essex Second XI in 1964 and two years later broke into their County Championship side for the first time. A right-arm fast-medium bowler, he went on to take a total of 117 first-class wickets for Essex, at an average of 29.92.

From 1968 until 1970, he proved to be a capable wicket-taker for Cambridge University as well, with 57 first-class wickets at 31.66. He took a career high 50 wickets in the 1968 season, which he spent playing for both Essex and Cambridge University. It was with Cambridge that he took the only five wicket haul of his career, against Sussex in 1969. Jorden dismissed five of the top six Sussex batsman in the first innings to claim figures of 5-95. He captained the university team in 1969 and 1970. He also played one first-class match for a combined Oxford and Cambridge Universities team.

He played Minor Counties and List A cricket for Bedfordshire from 1975 to 1977.

Rugby career
Just as his first-class cricket career was coming to an end in 1970, Jorden was called up to the England rugby union team, who were to play against France in Paris, as a replacement at fullback for Bob Hiller. As England's designated kicker, Jorden slotted two conversions and a penalty, but France won the Test 35-13. He didn't play again until the 1973 Five Nations Championship, where he made three appearances and contributed 15 points with the boot. His next cap came against France in 1974 and he made two further appearances, both in 1975. He ended his Test career with seven caps and 22 points, but no tries.

Over the course of his rugby career, he played for the Barbarians, Blackheath, Bedford, Eastern Counties and London.

References

External links
 
 Tony Jorden at ESPN Scrum

1947 births
Living people
People educated at Monmouth School for Boys
Alumni of Fitzwilliam College, Cambridge
English rugby union players
England international rugby union players
Barbarian F.C. players
Bedford Blues players
Blackheath F.C. players
English cricketers
Essex cricketers
Cambridge University cricketers
Bedfordshire cricketers
Oxford and Cambridge Universities cricketers
People from Radlett
Cambridge University R.U.F.C. players
Rugby union players from Hertfordshire
Rugby union fullbacks